Róbert Kiss (born 6 February 1967) is a Hungarian foil fencer. He competed in the individual and team foil events at the 1992 and 1996 Summer Olympics.

References

External links
 

1967 births
Living people
Hungarian male foil fencers
Olympic fencers of Hungary
Fencers at the 1992 Summer Olympics
Fencers at the 1996 Summer Olympics
Fencers from Budapest